Michael Moncrieff (born 19 August 1952) is a former Australian rules footballer who played for Hawthorn in the VFL during the 1970s and early 80s.

A tall full forward, Moncrieff was a prolific goalkicker for Hawthorn and topped their goalkicking on five occasions. The two times that he kicked 90 or more goals in a season came in premiership years for Hawthorn, 1976 and 1978. In 1976 he managed a career high 97 goals.

In 1977, with the return of champion Tasmanian full-forward Peter Hudson, Moncrieff moved to the backline. He returned full forward in 1978 and in the 1978 Grand Final he kicked four goals. He represented Victoria on three occasions. He kicked 10 goals in a match three times and holds the joint Hawthorn record for most goals in a final, kicking eight in the 1978 Qualifying Final against Collingwood.

Prior to the 1984 season, Moncrieff joined . As was permitted by the rules, Moncrieff trained and played practice matches with St Kilda during the pre-season while St Kilda and Hawthorn continued to negotiate his clearance and transfer fee; but negotiations broke down and a transfer fee became nearly impossible to assess when Moncrieff suffered a serious knee injury in a practice match, which saw him miss fifteen months of football and ultimately retire from the VFL without playing a match for St Kilda. Following this case, the rules were amended to require a player's clearance to be finalized before he could train with his new club.

In 1986, Moncrieff played for Sandringham in the Victorian Football Association.

Off-field, Moncrieff served as president of the Victorian Football League Players' Association, and later served as a member of the AFL Grievance Tribunal.

Honours and achievements 
Hawthorn
 2× VFL premiership player: 1976, 1978
 2× Minor premiership: 1971, 1975

Individual
 5× Hawthorn leading goalkicker: 1974, 1976, 1978, 1979, 1980
 Hawthorn life member

References

Michael Moncrieff Profile

1952 births
Living people
Australian rules footballers from Victoria (Australia)
Hawthorn Football Club players
Hawthorn Football Club Premiership players
Sandringham Football Club players
Victorian State of Origin players
Two-time VFL/AFL Premiership players